Stony Run is an unincorporated community in Albany Township in Berks County, Pennsylvania, United States. Stony Run is located at the intersection of Pennsylvania Route 737 and Wessnerville Road.

References

Unincorporated communities in Berks County, Pennsylvania
Unincorporated communities in Pennsylvania